A thin-film solar cell is a second generation solar cell that is made by depositing one or more thin layers, or thin film (TF) of photovoltaic material on a substrate, such as glass, plastic or metal. Thin-film solar cells are commercially used in several technologies, including cadmium telluride (CdTe), copper indium gallium diselenide (CIGS), and amorphous thin-film silicon (a-Si, TF-Si).

Film thickness varies from a few nanometers (nm) to tens of micrometers (µm), much thinner than thin-film's rival technology, the conventional, first-generation crystalline silicon solar cell (c-Si), that uses wafers of up to 200 µm thick. This allows thin film cells to be flexible, and lower in weight. It is used in building-integrated photovoltaics and as semi-transparent, photovoltaic glazing material that can be laminated onto windows. Other commercial applications use rigid thin film solar panels (interleaved between two panes of glass) in some of the world's largest photovoltaic power stations.

Thin-film technology has always been cheaper but less efficient than conventional c-Si technology. However, it has significantly improved over the years. The lab cell efficiency for CdTe and CIGS is now beyond 21 percent, outperforming multicrystalline silicon, the dominant material currently used in most solar PV systems. Accelerated life testing of thin film modules under laboratory conditions measured a somewhat faster degradation compared to conventional PV, while a lifetime of 20 years or more is generally expected. Despite these enhancements, the market-share of thin-film never reached more than 20 percent in the last two decades and has been declining in recent years to about 9 percent of worldwide photovoltaic installations in 2013.

Other thin-film technologies that are still in an early stage of ongoing research or with limited commercial availability are often classified as emerging or third generation photovoltaic cells and include organic, dye-sensitized, as well as quantum dot, copper zinc tin sulfide, nanocrystal, micromorph, and perovskite solar cells.

History 

Thin film cells are well-known since the late 1970s, when solar calculators powered by a small strip of amorphous silicon appeared on the market.

They are now available in very large modules used in sophisticated building-integrated installations and vehicle charging systems.

Although thin-film technology was expected to make significant advances in the market and to surpass the dominating conventional crystalline silicon (c-Si) technology in the long-term, market-share has been declining for several years now. While in 2010, when there was a shortage of conventional PV modules, thin-film accounted for 15 percent of the overall market, it declined to 8 percent in 2014, and is expected to stabilize at 7 percent from 2015 onward, with amorphous silicon expected to lose half of its market-share by the end of the decade.

Materials 

Thin-film technologies reduce the amount of active material in a cell. Most sandwich active material between two panes of glass. Since silicon solar panels only use one pane of glass, thin film panels are approximately twice as heavy as crystalline silicon panels, although they have a smaller ecological impact (determined from life cycle analysis). The majority of film panels have 2-3 percentage points lower conversion efficiencies than crystalline silicon. Cadmium telluride (CdTe), copper indium gallium selenide (CIGS) and amorphous silicon (a-Si) are three thin-film technologies often used for outdoor applications.

Cadmium telluride 

Cadmium telluride (CdTe) is the predominant thin film technology. With about 5 percent of worldwide PV production, it accounts for more than half of the thin film market. The cell's lab efficiency has also increased significantly in recent years and is on a par with CIGS thin film and close to the efficiency of multi-crystalline silicon as of 2013. Also, CdTe has the lowest Energy payback time of all mass-produced PV technologies, and can be as short as eight months in favorable locations. A prominent manufacturer is the US-company First Solar based in Tempe, Arizona, that produces CdTe-panels with an efficiency of about 18 percent.

Although the toxicity of cadmium may not be that much of an issue and environmental concerns completely resolved with the recycling of CdTe modules at the end of their life time, there are still uncertainties and the public opinion is skeptical towards this technology. The usage of rare materials may also become a limiting factor to the industrial scalability of CdTe thin film technology. The rarity of tellurium—of which telluride is the anionic form—is comparable to that of platinum in the earth's crust and contributes significantly to the module's cost.

Copper indium gallium selenide 

A copper indium gallium selenide solar cell or CIGS cell uses an absorber made of copper, indium, gallium, selenide (CIGS), while gallium-free variants of the semiconductor material are abbreviated CIS. It is one of three mainstream thin-film technologies, the other two being cadmium telluride and amorphous silicon, with a lab-efficiency above 20 percent and a share of 2 percent in the overall PV market in 2013. A prominent manufacturer of cylindrical CIGS-panels was the now-bankrupt company Solyndra in Fremont, California. Traditional methods of fabrication involve vacuum processes including co-evaporation and sputtering. In 2008, IBM and Tokyo Ohka Kogyo Co., Ltd. (TOK) announced they had developed a new, non-vacuum, solution-based manufacturing process for CIGS cells and are aiming for efficiencies of 15% and beyond.

Hyperspectral imaging has been used to characterize these cells. Researchers from IRDEP (Institute of Research and Development in Photovoltaic Energy) in collaboration with Photon etc.¸ were able to determine the splitting of the quasi-Fermi level with photoluminescence mapping while the electroluminescence data were used to derive the external quantum efficiency (EQE). Also, through a light beam induced current (LBIC) cartography experiment, the EQE of a microcrystalline CIGS solar cell could be determined at any point in the field of view.

As of April 2019, current conversion efficiency record for a laboratory CIGS cell stands at 22.9%.

Silicon 

Three major silicon-based module designs dominate: 
 amorphous silicon cells 
 amorphous / microcrystalline tandem cells (micromorph)
 thin-film polycrystalline silicon on glass.

Amorphous silicon 

Amorphous silicon (a-Si) is a non-crystalline, allotropic form of silicon and the most well-developed thin film technology to-date. Thin-film silicon is an alternative to conventional wafer (or bulk) crystalline silicon. While chalcogenide-based CdTe and CIS thin films cells have been developed in the lab with great success, there is still industry interest in silicon-based thin film cells. Silicon-based devices exhibit fewer problems than their CdTe and CIS counterparts such as toxicity and humidity issues with CdTe cells and low manufacturing yields of CIS due to material complexity. Additionally, due to political resistance to the use non-"green" materials in solar energy production, there is no stigma in the use of standard silicon.

This type of thin-film cell is mostly fabricated by a technique called plasma-enhanced chemical vapor deposition. It uses a gaseous mixture of silane (SiH4) and hydrogen to deposit a very thin layer of only 1 micrometre (µm) of silicon on a substrate, such as glass, plastic or metal, that has already been coated with a layer of transparent conducting oxide. Other methods used to deposit amorphous silicon on a substrate include sputtering and hot wire chemical vapor deposition techniques.

a-Si is attractive as a solar cell material because it's an abundant, non-toxic material. It requires a low processing temperature and enables a scalable production upon a flexible, low-cost substrate with little silicon material required. Due to its bandgap of 1.7 eV, amorphous silicon also absorbs a very broad range of the light spectrum, that includes infrared and even some ultraviolet and performs very well at weak light. This allows the cell to generate power in the early morning, or late afternoon and on cloudy and rainy days, contrary to crystalline silicon cells, that are significantly less efficient when exposed at diffuse and indirect daylight.

However, the efficiency of an a-Si cell suffers a significant drop of about 10 to 30 percent during the first six months of operation. This is called the Staebler-Wronski effect (SWE) – a typical loss in electrical output due to changes in photoconductivity and dark conductivity caused by prolonged exposure to sunlight. Although this degradation is perfectly reversible upon annealing at or above 150 °C, conventional c-Si solar cells do not exhibit this effect in the first place.

Its basic electronic structure is the p-i-n junction. The amorphous structure of a-Si implies high inherent disorder and dangling bonds, making it a bad conductor for charge carriers. These dangling bonds act as recombination centers that severely reduce carrier lifetime. A p-i-n structure is usually used, as opposed to an n-i-p structure. This is because the mobility of electrons in a-Si:H is roughly 1 or 2 orders of magnitude larger than that of holes, and thus the collection rate of electrons moving from the n- to p-type contact is better than holes moving from p- to n-type contact. Therefore, the p-type layer should be placed at the top where the light intensity is stronger, so that the majority of the charge carriers crossing the junction are electrons.

Tandem-cell using a-Si/μc-Si 

A layer of amorphous silicon can be combined with layers of other allotropic forms of silicon to produce a multi-junction solar cell. When only two layers (two p-n junctions) are combined, it is called a tandem-cell. By stacking these layers on top of one other, a broader range of the light spectra is absorbed, improving the cell's overall efficiency.

In micromorphous silicon, a layer of microcrystalline silicon (μc-Si) is combined with amorphous silicon, creating a tandem cell. The top a-Si layer absorbs the visible light, leaving the infrared part to the bottom μc-Si layer. The micromorph stacked-cell concept was pioneered and patented at the Institute of Microtechnology (IMT) of the Neuchâtel University in Switzerland, and was licensed to TEL Solar. A new world record PV module based on the micromorph concept with 12.24% module efficiency was independently certified in July 2014.

Because all layers are made of silicon, they can be manufactured using PECVD. The band gap of a-Si is 1.7 eV and that of c-Si is 1.1 eV. The c-Si layer can absorb red and infrared light. The best efficiency can be achieved at transition between a-Si and c-Si. As nanocrystalline silicon (nc-Si) has about the same bandgap as c-Si, nc-Si can replace c-Si.

Tandem-cell using a-Si/pc-Si 

Amorphous silicon can also be combined with protocrystalline silicon (pc-Si) into a tandem-cell. Protocrystalline silicon with a low volume fraction of nanocrystalline silicon is optimal for high open-circuit voltage. These types of silicon present dangling and twisted bonds, which results in deep defects (energy levels in the bandgap) as well as deformation of the valence and conduction bands (band tails).

Polycrystalline silicon on glass 

A new attempt to fuse the advantages of bulk silicon with those of thin-film devices is thin film polycrystalline silicon on glass. These modules are produced by depositing an antireflection coating and doped silicon onto textured glass substrates using plasma-enhanced chemical vapor deposition (PECVD). The texture in the glass enhances the efficiency of the cell by approximately 3% by reducing the amount of incident light reflecting from the solar cell and trapping light inside the solar cell. The silicon film is crystallized by an annealing step, temperatures of 400–600 Celsius, resulting in polycrystalline silicon.

These new devices show energy conversion efficiencies of 8% and high manufacturing yields of >90%. Crystalline silicon on glass (CSG), where the polycrystalline silicon is 1–2 micrometres, is noted for its stability and durability; the use of thin film techniques also contributes to a cost savings over bulk photovoltaics. These modules do not require the presence of a transparent conducting oxide layer. This simplifies the production process twofold; not only can this step be skipped, but the absence of this layer makes the process of constructing a contact scheme much simpler. Both of these simplifications further reduce the cost of production. Despite the numerous advantages over alternative design, production cost estimations on a per unit area basis show that these devices are comparable in cost to single-junction amorphous thin film cells.

Gallium arsenide 

Gallium arsenide (GaAs) is a III-V direct bandgap semiconductor and is a very common material used for single-crystalline thin-film solar cells. GaAs solar cells have continued to be one of the highest performing thin-film solar cells due to their exceptional heat resistant properties and high efficiencies. As of 2019, single-crystalline GaAs cells have shown the highest solar cell efficiency of any single-junction solar cell with an efficiency of 29.1%. This record-holding cell achieved this high efficiency by implementing a back mirror on the rear surface to increase photon absorption which allowed the cell to attain an impressive short-circuit current density and an open-circuit voltage value near the Shockley–Queisser limit. As a result, GaAs solar cells have nearly reached their maximum efficiency although improvements can still be made by employing light trapping strategies.

GaAs thin-films are most commonly fabricated using epitaxial growth of the semiconductor on a substrate material. The epitaxial lift-off (ELO) technique, first demonstrated in 1978, has proven to be the most promising and effective. In this method, the thin film layer is peeled off of the substrate by selectively etching a sacrificial layer that was placed between the epitaxial film and substrate. The GaAs film and the substrate remain minimally damaged through the separation process, allowing for the reuse of the host substrate. With reuse of the substrate the fabrication costs can be reduced, but not completely forgone, since the substrate can only be reused a limited number of times. This process is still relatively costly and research is still being done to find more cost-effective ways of growing the epitaxial film layer onto a substrate.

Despite the high performance of GaAs thin-film cells, the expensive material costs hinder their ability for wide-scale adoption in the solar cell industry. GaAs is more commonly used in multi-junction solar cells for solar panels on spacecraft, as the larger power to weight ratio lowers the launch costs in space-based solar power (InGaP/(In)GaAs/Ge cells). They are also used in concentrator photovoltaics, an emerging technology best suited for locations that receive much sunlight, using lenses to focus sunlight on a much smaller, thus less expensive GaAs concentrator solar cell.

Emerging photovoltaics 

The National Renewable Energy Laboratory classifies a number of thin-film technologies as emerging photovoltaics—most of them have not yet been commercially applied and are still in the research or development phase. Many use organic materials, often organometallic compounds as well as inorganic substances. Despite the fact that their efficiencies had been low and the stability of the absorber material was often too short for commercial applications, there is a lot of research invested into these technologies as they promise to achieve the goal of producing low-cost, high-efficient solar cells.

Emerging photovoltaics, often called third generation photovoltaic cells, include:
 Copper zinc tin sulfide solar cell (CZTS), and derivates CZTSe and CZTSSe
 Dye-sensitized solar cell, also known as "Grätzel cell"
 Organic solar cell
 Perovskite solar cell
 Quantum dot solar cell

Perovskite solar cells 

Especially the achievements in the research of perovskite cells have received tremendous attention in the public, as their research efficiencies recently soared above 20 percent. They also offer a wide spectrum of low-cost applications. In addition, another emerging technology, concentrator photovoltaics (CPV), uses high-efficient, multi-junction solar cells in combination with optical lenses and a tracking system.

Transparent solar cells 
In 2022, semitransparent solar cells that are as large as windows were reported, after team members of the study achieved record efficiency with high transparency in 2020. Also in 2022, other researchers reported the fabrication of solar cells with a record average visible transparency of 79%, being nearly invisible.

Efficiencies 

The achievable efficiency of thin-film solar cells is extremely dependent on the semiconductor chosen and the growth technology.  Incremental improvements in efficiency began with the invention of the first modern silicon solar cell in 1954. By 2010 these steady improvements had resulted in modules capable of converting 12 to 18 percent of solar radiation into electricity. The improvements to efficiency have continued to accelerate in the years since 2010, as shown in the accompanying chart.

Cells made from newer materials tend to be less efficient than bulk silicon, but are less expensive to produce. Their quantum efficiency is also lower due to reduced number of collected charge carriers per incident photon.

The performance and potential of thin-film materials are high, reaching cell efficiencies of 12–20%; prototype module efficiencies of 7–13%; and production modules in the range of 9%.
The thin film cell prototype with the best efficiency yields 20.4% (First Solar), comparable to the best conventional solar cell prototype efficiency of 25.6% from Panasonic.

NREL once predicted that costs would drop below $100/m2 in volume production, and could later fall below $50/m2.

A new record for thin film solar cell efficiency of 22.3% has been achieved by Solar Frontier, the world's largest CIS (copper indium selenium) solar energy provider. In joint research with the New Energy and Industrial Technology Development Organization (NEDO) of Japan, Solar Frontier achieved 22.3% conversion efficiency on a 0.5 cm2 cell using its CIS technology. This is an increase of 0.6 percentage points over the industry's previous thin-film record of 21.7%.

Absorption 

Multiple techniques have been employed to increase the amount of light that enters the cell and reduce the amount that escapes without absorption. The most obvious technique is to minimize the top contact coverage of the cell surface, reducing the area that blocks light from reaching the cell.

The weakly absorbed long wavelength light can be obliquely coupled into silicon and traverses the film several times to enhance absorption.

Multiple methods have been developed to increase absorption by reducing the number of incident photons being reflected away from the cell surface. An additional anti-reflective coating can cause destructive interference within the cell by modulating the refractive index of the surface coating. Destructive interference eliminates the reflective wave, causing all incident light to enter the cell.

Surface texturing is another option for increasing absorption, but increases costs. By applying a texture to the active material's surface, the reflected light can be refracted into striking the surface again, thus reducing reflectance. For example, black silicon texturing by reactive ion etching (RIE) is an effective and economic approach to increase the absorption of thin-film silicon solar cells. A textured back reflector can prevent light from escaping through the rear of the cell. Instead of applying the texturing on the active materials, photonic micro-structured coatings applied on the cells' front contact can be an interesting alternative for light-trapping, as they allow both geometric anti-reflection and light scattering while avoiding the roughening of the photovoltaic layers (thereby preventing increase of recombination). 

Besides surface texturing, the plasmonic light-trapping scheme attracted a lot of attention to aid photocurrent enhancement in thin film solar cells. This method makes use of collective oscillation of excited free electrons in noble metal nanoparticles, which are influenced by particle shape, size and dielectric properties of the surrounding medium. Applying noble-metal nanoparticles at the back of thin-film solar cells leads to the formation of plasmonic back reflectors, which allow broadband photocurrent enhancement. This is a result of both light scattering of the weakly-absorbed photons from the rear-located nanoparticles, plus improved light incoupling (geometric anti-reflection) caused by the hemispherical corrugations at the cells’ front surface formed from the conformal deposition of the cell materials over the particles.

In addition to minimizing reflective loss, the solar cell material itself can be optimized to have higher chance of absorbing a photon that reaches it. Thermal processing techniques can significantly enhance the crystal quality of silicon cells and thereby increase efficiency. Layering thin-film cells to create a multi-junction solar cell can also be done. Each layer's band gap can be designed to best absorb a different range of wavelengths, such that together they can absorb a greater spectrum of light.

Further advancement into geometric considerations can exploit nanomaterial dimensionality. Large, parallel nanowire arrays enable long absorption lengths along the length of the wire while maintaining short minority carrier diffusion lengths along the radial direction. Adding nanoparticles between the nanowires allows conduction. The natural geometry of these arrays forms a textured surface that traps more light.

Production, cost and market 

With the advances in conventional crystalline silicon (c-Si) technology in recent years, and the falling cost of the polysilicon feedstock, that followed after a period of severe global shortage, pressure increased on manufacturers of commercial thin-film technologies, including amorphous thin-film silicon (a-Si), cadmium telluride (CdTe), and copper indium gallium diselenide (CIGS), leading to the bankruptcy of several companies. As of 2013, thin-film manufacturers continue to face price competition from Chinese refiners of silicon and manufacturers of conventional c-Si solar panels. Some companies together with their patents were sold to Chinese firms below cost.

Market-share 

In 2013 thin-film technologies accounted for about 9 percent of worldwide deployment, while 91 percent was held by crystalline silicon (mono-Si and multi-Si). With 5 percent of the overall market, CdTe holds more than half of the thin-film market, leaving 2 percent to each CIGS and amorphous silicon.

CIGS technology 

Several prominent manufacturers couldn't stand the pressure caused by advances in conventional c-Si technology of recent years. The company Solyndra ceased all business activity and filed for Chapter 11 bankruptcy in 2011, and Nanosolar, also a CIGS manufacturer, closed its doors in 2013. Although both companies produced CIGS solar cells, it has been pointed out, that the failure was not due to the technology but rather because of the companies themselves, using a flawed architecture, such as, for example, Solyndra's cylindrical substrates. In 2014, Korean LG Electronics terminated research on CIGS restructuring its solar business, and Samsung SDI decided to cease CIGS-production, while Chinese PV manufacturer Hanergy is expected to ramp up production capacity of their 15.5% efficient, 650 mm×1650 mm CIGS-modules. One of the largest producers of CI(G)S photovoltaics is the Japanese company Solar Frontier with a manufacturing capacity in the gigawatt-scale. (Also see List of CIGS companies).

CdTe technology 

The company First Solar, a leading manufacturer of CdTe, has been building several of the world's largest solar power stations, such as the Desert Sunlight Solar Farm and Topaz Solar Farm, both in the Californian desert with a 550 MW capacity each, as well as the 102-megawatt Nyngan Solar Plant in Australia, the largest PV power station in the Southern Hemisphere, commissioned in 2015.

In 2011, GE announced plans to spend $600 million on a new CdTe solar cell plant and enter this market, and in 2013, First Solar bought GE's CdTe thin-film intellectual property portfolio and formed a business partnership. In 2012 Abound Solar, a manufacturer of cadmium telluride modules, went bankrupt.

a-Si technology 

In 2012, ECD solar, once one of the world's leading manufacturer of amorphous silicon (a-Si) technology, filed for bankruptcy in Michigan, United States. Swiss OC Oerlikon divested its solar division that produced a-Si/μc-Si tandem cells to Tokyo Electron Limited.

Other companies that left the amorphous silicon thin-film market include DuPont, BP, Flexcell, Inventux, Pramac, Schuco, Sencera, EPV Solar, NovaSolar (formerly OptiSolar) and Suntech Power that stopped manufacturing a-Si modules in 2010 to focus on conventional silicon solar panels. In 2013, Suntech filed for bankruptcy in China. In August 2013, the spot market price of thin-film a-Si and a-Si/µ-Si dropped to €0.36 and €0.46, respectively (about $0.50 and $0.60) per watt.

Thin film solar on metal roofs

With the increasing efficiencies of thin film solar, installing them on metal roofs has become cost competitive with traditional Monocrystalline and Polycrystalline solar cells.  The thin film panels are flexible and run down the standing seam metal roofs and stick to the metal roof with Adhesive, so no holes are needed to install. The connection wires run under the ridge cap at the top of the roof. Efficiency ranges from 10-18% but only costs about $2.00-$3.00 per watt of installed capacity, compared to Monocrystalline which is 	17-22% efficient and costs $3.00-$3.50 per watt of installed capacity.  Thin film solar is light weight at 7-10 ounces per square foot.  Thin film solar panels last 10-20 years but have a quicker ROI than traditional solar panels, the metal roofs last 40-70 years before replacement compared to 12-20 years for an asphalt shingle roof.

See also 

 List of photovoltaics companies
 Plasmonic solar cell
 Net metering

References

Sources 
Grama, S. "A Survey of Thin-Film Solar Photovoltaic Industry & Technologies." Massachusetts Institute of Technology, 2008.
Green, Martin A. "Consolidation of thin-film photovoltaic technology: the coming decade of opportunity.” Progress in Photovoltaics: Research and Applications 14, no. 5 (2006): 383–392.
Green, M. A. “Recent developments in photovoltaics.” Solar Energy 76, no. 1-3 (2004): 3–8.
Beaucarne, Guy. “Silicon Thin-Film Solar Cells.” Advances in OptoElectronics 2007 (August 2007): 12.
Ullal, H. S., and B. von Roedern. “Thin Film CIGS and CdTe Photovoltaic Technologies: Commercialization, Critical Issues, and Applications; Preprint” (2007).
Hegedus, S. “Thin film solar modules: the low cost, high throughput and versatile alternative to Si wafers.” Progress in Photovoltaics: Research and Applications 14, no. 5 (2006): 393–411.
Poortmans, J., and V. Arkhipov. Thin Film Solar Cells: Fabrication, Characterization and Applications. Wiley, 2006.
Wronski, C.R., B. Von Roedern, and A. Kolodziej. “Thin-film Si:H-based solar cells.” Vacuum 82, no. 10 (June 3, 2008): 1145–1150.
Chopra, K. L., P. D. Paulson, and V. Dutta. “Thin-film solar cells: an overview.” Progress in Photovoltaics: Research and Applications 12, no. 2-3 (2004): 69–92.
Hamakawa, Y. Thin-Film Solar Cells: Next Generation Photovoltaics and Its Applications. Springer, 2004.
Green, Martin. “Thin-film solar cells: review of materials, technologies and commercial status.” Journal of Materials Science: Materials in Electronics 18 (October 1, 2007): 15–19.

External links 
Solar Panels, Link Solar
 Flexcellence, a STReP financed by the Sixth Framework Programme (FP6) of the EU. Full title : Roll-to-roll technology for the production of high-efficiency low cost thin-film silicon photovoltaic modules.